A bagad is a Breton band, composed of bagpipes, bombards and drums (including snare, tenor and bass drums). The pipe band tradition in Brittany was inspired by the Scottish example and has developed since the mid-20th century. A bagad plays mainly Breton music, but a bagad's music is evolutionary: new forms and musical ideas are experimented with at each annual national competition.

The plural for bagad is unusual in that many are referred to as bagadoù but for two, three or any other specified number they are simply referred to as bagad (following the rules of Breton grammar).

Every major town and city in Brittany has at least one bagad and there are over eighty in total. There are also many bagadoù outside Brittany, owing to large-scale Breton emigration throughout France. Bagad Lann Bihoue is well known to belong to the French Navy.

For competition purposes the bagadoù are ranked into five categories. Major competitions take place annually in Brest and in Lorient, where the National Championship takes place during the Interceltic Festival in August.

Premier Category 2008 

The most successful bagadoù compete in the 'Premier Category'.

 Bagad Brieg, Briec – Bagad Brieg
 Kevrenn Alre, Auray – Kevrenn Alre
 Bagad Roñsed-Mor, Locoal-Mendon – Bagad Roñsed-Mor
 Bagad Kemper, Quimper – Bagad Kemper
 Bagad Cap Caval, Plomeur – Bagad Cap Caval
 Kerlenn Pondi, Pontivy – Bagad Kerlenn Pondi
 Bagad Bro Kemperle, Quimperlé – Bagad Bro Kemperle
 Bagad Quic-en-groigne, Saint-Malo – Bagad Quic-en-Groigne
 Bagad Gwengamp, Guingamp – Bagad Gwengamp
 Bagad Sant-Nazer, Saint-Nazaire – Bagad Saint-Nazaire
 Bagad Er Melinerion, Vannes – Bagad er Melinerion
 Bagad Beuzeg ar C'hab, Beuzec-Cap-Sizun – Bagad Beuzeg ar C'hab
 Bagad Penhars, Quimper – Bagad Penhars
 Bagad Ar Meilhoù-Glaz, Quimper – Bagad Ar Meilhoù-Glaz
 Bagad Sonerien Bro Dreger, Perros-Guirec – Bagad Sonerien Bro Dreger

National Champions 
 2017 Bagad Cap Caval
 2016 Bagad Cap Caval
 2015 Bagad Cap Caval
 2014 Bagad Kemper
 2013 Bagad Kemper
 2012 Bagad Kemper
 2011 Bagad Kemper
 2010 Bagad Cap Caval
 2009 Bagad Cap Caval
 2008 Bagad Cap Caval
 2007 Bagad Brieg
 2006 Bagad Kevrenn Alré
 2005 Bagad Kevrenn Alré
 2004 Bagad Kemper
 2003 Bagad Ronsed Mor
 2002 Bagad Kemper

External links 

 Official Bagadou Association: Bodadeg Ar Sonerion
 Bagadou